Ceccarelli is a common Italian surname.

Geographical distribution
As of 2014, 85.8% of all known bearers of the surname Ceccarelli were residents of Italy (frequency 1:2,503), 4.9% of the United States (1:257,301), 3.4% of France (1:68,423), 2.0% of Argentina (1:74,207) and 1.4% of Brazil (1:513,850).

In Italy, the frequency of the surname was higher than national average (1:2,503) in the following regions:
 1. Umbria (1:336)
 2. Lazio (1:589)
 3. Tuscany (1:612)
 4. Marche (1:846)
 5. Emilia-Romagna (1:1,977)

People 
 Alfonso Ceccarelli (1532–1583), Italian physician and genealogist
 André "Dédé" Ceccarelli (born 1946), French jazz drummer 
 Art Ceccarelli (born 1930), retired American baseball player
 Benedetta Ceccarelli (born 1980), Italian track-and-field athlete
 Cate Ceccarelli (born 2000), Chilean public figure
 Cecilia Ceccarelli, Italian astronomer
 Daniela Ceccarelli (born 1975), Italian alpine skier
 Dave Ceccarelli (born c. 1935), American former politician in the state of Washington
 Domenico Ceccarelli (1905–?), Italian boxer
 Fabio Ceccarelli, (born 1983) Italian footballer
 Francesco Ceccarelli (1752–1814), Italian soprano castrato singer
 Giancarlo Ceccarelli (born 1956), retired Italian footballer
 Luca Ceccarelli (footballer, born 20 March 1983), Italian footballer currently playing for Arezzo
 Luca Ceccarelli (footballer, born 24 March 1983), Italian footballer currently playing for San Marino Calcio
 Luigi Ceccarelli (born 1953), Italian composer
 Marc Ceccarelli (born 1968), American animator, director, producer, and writer
 Naddo Ceccarelli 14th-century Italian painter
 Odoardo Ceccarelli (c. 1600–1668), Italian singer and composer 
 Paolo Ceccarelli (born 1969), Canadian soccer player, 1996 A-League Goalkeeper of the Year
 Pietro Ceccarelli (born 1992), Italian rugby union player
 Sandra Ceccarelli (born 1967), Italian film actress
 Tommaso Ceccarelli (born 1992), Italian football winger
 Ugo Ceccarelli (1911–1940), Italian modern pentathlete

References

Italian-language surnames
Surnames of Italian origin